Greater Kolkata College of Engineering and Management, Baruipur, GKCEM Baruipur, GKCEMB) is a self-financed institute in the state of the West Bengal. Greater Kolkata College of Engineering and Management is ranked one of the best engineering colleges in Eastern India. The campus is situated on the southern fringes of Kolkata. It is affiliated with Maulana Abul Kalam Azad University of Technology Kolkata.

History 
Greater Kolkata College of Engineering and Management was set up on the southern part of  Kolkata in 2008 by a group of education activists hailing from the flourishing information technology, electronics, and related industries around Kolkata. The foundation behind the growth of GKCEM is JIS Group. To meet the demand for technical manpower and in view of fiscal constraints at the governmental level, JIS Group supplemented the state government's efforts in setting up new engineering colleges by establishing a college at Asansol in August 1998.

Departments in Faculty of Engineering and Technology
The institute offers one undergraduate course (B. Tech.) and one diploma course. All courses are approved by the All India Council for Technical Education AICTE, Government of India, and the Department of Higher Education, Government of West Bengal. Since its inception, it has been affiliated to the West Bengal University of Technology, Kolkata.

The institute offers undergraduate B. Tech. course in the following engineering disciplines:

 Civil Engineering
 Computer Science and Engineering
 Electrical Engineering
 Electronics and Communication Engineering
 Mechanical Engineering

Facilities and Infrastructure 

 Sports Facilities
 Fire Safety
 Transportation
 Cafeteria
 Student Accommodation

References

External links

Engineering colleges in Kolkata
Colleges affiliated to West Bengal University of Technology
2008 establishments in West Bengal
Educational institutions established in 2008